San Pasqual may refer to:
Rancho San Pascual, land grant
San Pasqual, Los Angeles County, California
San Pasqual Valley, San Diego, California
San Pasqual, San Diego County, California, the Kumeyaay village that was once located in the San Pasqual Valley and for which the valley is named. 
San Pasqual Valley AVA
San Pasqual Battlefield State Historic Park
Battle of San Pasqual
San Pasqual Handicap, a horse race
 Roman Catholic saints, in English referred to as Saint Paschal
San Pasqual Band of Diegueno Mission Indians

See also
 San Pascual (disambiguation)
 San Pasquale (disambiguation)